The Edward and Elizabeth Partridge House is a historic house in Fillmore, Utah. It was built in 1871 by stonemason Lewis Tarbuck for Edward Partridge Jr., a farmer, merchant leader in the Church of Jesus Christ of Latter-day Saints and politician who served as a member of the Utah Territorial Legislature in 1873 and as the mayor of Fillmore in the mid-1870s. Partridge was a member of the Church of Jesus Christ of Latter-day Saints, and he served as the bishop of the Fillmore ward from 1864 to 1877; he was also a missionary to the Sandwich Islands in 1854, and again in 1882–1885. He had two wives, Sarah Lucretia Clayton and Elizabeth Buxton, and 17 children. His first wife and children resided in Provo while Partridge and his second wife lived in this house, designed in the Gothic Revival style. It has been listed on the National Register of Historic Places since May 14, 1993.

References

		
National Register of Historic Places in Millard County, Utah
Gothic Revival architecture in Utah
Houses completed in 1871
1871 establishments in Utah Territory